Lyudinovsky Locomotive Plant is a plant in Lyudinovsky founded in 1745. In 2007 the works became part of Sinara Transport Machines.

 it produces shunting locomotives with both hydraulic transmission: TGM3B (ТГМ4Б) and TGM6A (ТГМ6Д), and electrical transmission: TEM7A (ТЭМ7А) and TEM9  (ТЭМ9).

Gallery

References

External links
 

Locomotive manufacturers of Russia
Sinara Group
Companies based in Kaluga Oblast
Companies established in 1745